Georges Duthuit (1891–1973) was a French writer, art critic and historian.

Duthuit was a key commentator on Matisse, Nicolas de Staël, Jean-Paul Riopelle, and Bram van Velde. He maintained a close association with the surrealists, particularly André Masson. In 1939, he was among the intellectuals convened for George Bataille's College of Sociology. Part of his correspondences on contemporary art with Samuel Beckett form the text Three Dialogues, originally published in the literary journal, transition.

Sources

 George Duthuit on Dumbarton Oaks website

1891 births
1973 deaths
20th-century French non-fiction writers
French art historians